Hasanabad (also Romanized as Ḩasanābād; also known as Ḩasanābād-e Chaykand and Ḩasanābād-e Chāy Kand) is a village in Anguran Rural District, Anguran District, Mahneshan County, Zanjan Province, Iran. At the 2006 census, its population was 328, in 79 families.

References 

Populated places in Mahneshan County